= The Ultimate Party Collection Vol. 1 =

Studio album by Sick Animation
- Released: September 24, 2007
- Genre: Rap
- Length: 1:19:11
- Label: Sick Animation

Sick Animation chronology
The Ultimate Party Collection Vol. 1 (2007)	Sex, Drugs and Rock n' LOL (2010)

Professional ratings
Review scores
Source	Rating
Sputnik Music	(4.3/5)

"The Ultimate Party Collection Vol. 1" is the first album released by Sick Animation's Marc M. It was released on September 24, 2007.

== Track listing ==
All tracks are written by Marc M.

No.	Title	Length
1.	"I Like Nerds"	0:59
2.	"I Ain't Scared"	1:43
3.	"When I Lay You Down"	4:05
4.	"This Bitch Is Alright"	1:25
5.	"Black History Month"	1:59
6.	"Walking Round the Bar Looking for a Girl to Eat Out"	1:07
7.	"Everybody Want a Hot Girl They Could Fuck"	1:14
8.	"Back To School"	3:25
9.	"I've Got Something On my Mind"	1:28
10.	"Mammarys and Cammarys"	2:32
11.	"Arithmetic"	0:57
12.	"Master So Fine"	1:59
13.	"Oh Jesus"	1:22
14.	"I'm Putting Spoons In Your Girlfriend"	1:00
15.	"How Bad Do You Want My Vagina Inside Ya"	0:53
16.	"Halloween Costume Contest"	5:01
17.	"Cats and Dogs"	2:52
18.	"Girl You Know I love you"	1:11
19.	"Rice and Gravy"	0:09
20.	"A Dude Named Shawn"	3:42
21.	"Six In a Row"	0:22
22.	"Spread Ya Lips Bitch"	1:02
23.	"Do You Wanna Come to My House"	1:24
24.	"Suck My Dick With a Condom On"	1:04
25.	"Tell Me Baby"	0:56
26.	"Back That Thing Up"	0:44
27.	"It's Christmas Bitch"	0:44
28.	"Shawns Got My Calculator"	0:26
29.	"I Want a Bag of Cheetos to Spread It's Lips and Sit on My Face Right Now"	1:02
30.	"Google My Love"	1:38
31.	"Let Me Put a Booger in Your Pussy Ch. 1"	0:41
32.	"Let Me Put a Booger in Your Pussy Ch. 2"	1:42
33.	"Let Me Put a Booger in Your Pussy Ch. 3"	1:32
34.	"Intermission"	0:33
35.	"I Like Puttin My Dick In Stuff"	0:53
36.	"Your Middle"	2:10
37.	"Jack Vids for Cash"	2:09
38.	"Crunchy Juicy Meaty"	1:31
39.	"The Sorcerer's Key"	0:16
40.	"Phony Pony"	0:37
41.	"Big Black Dick"	0:44
42.	"Patrick's Mouth"	0:55
43.	"Baby Girl"	0:57
44.	"Ps3mas"	1:14
45.	"Theme Song to Creature the Movie"	0:38
46.	"Blood On the Bed"	3:04
47.	"Ridin' On a Mershaq Back"	0:52
48.	"All This Biz"	0:32
49.	"Rally Round the Family"	0:46
50.	"How Many Times Has Your Pee Split In Half"	1:18
51.	"Love Song for Creature"	1:39
52.	"Dance Baby Dance"	1:26
53.	"A New Guy"	0:20
54.	"The Dragon Does"	0:30
55.	"Bayside Blues"	1:13
56.	"Do You Wanna Fuck Tonight"	0:50
57.	"I Know You Wanna Fuck This"	0:50
58.	"The End"	0:54
