= Sex, Drugs and Rock n' LOL =

Studio album by Sick Animation
- Released: July 4, 2010
- Genre: Rap,
- Length: 0:31:27
- Label: Sick Animation

Sick Animation chronology
The Ultimate Party Collection Vol. 1 (2007)	Sex, Drugs and Rock n' LOL (2010)	4 Song Flexi (2011)

Professional ratings
Review scores
Source	Rating
Sputnik Music	(3.8/5)

Sex, Drugs and Rock n' LOL is the second album released by Sick Animation's Marc M. It was released on July 4, 2010.

== Track listing ==
All tracks are written by Marc M.

No.	Title	Length
1.	"Bloody Bodies"	2:35
2.	"I Know Girl who..."	1:20
3.	"Let's Hit the Beach"	3:25
4.	"Mexico"	1:29
5.	"Nickelodeon Slime - Skit"	0:29
6.	"Put it on the Table"	1:23
7.	"You a Dike Ho (Now Get the F**k Off of My Porch)"	0:55
8.	"Summer Rain"	2:53
9.	"Crippled Horse ch.1 - Skit"	0:46
10.	"I'm Thirsty Bitch (Gimme a Drink)"	0:38
11.	"Crippled Horse ch.2 - Skit"	0:21
12.	"Nasty MoFo with a Dream"	0:49
13.	"Crippled Horse ch.3 - Skit"	0:44
14.	"This S**t"	3:53
15.	"Rookie of the Year"	1:34
16.	"Family Matters"	1:10
17.	"I Want 2 Fall n Luv w/ a Beautiful Grl"	6:00
18.	"I Wanna Put a Taco in Barack O's Cock Hole"	1:03
